The Beaumont Skerries are two small islands and several rocks  east of the Joubin Islands, off the southwest coast of Anvers Island. They were named by the Advisory Committee on Antarctic Names for Malcolm J. Beaumont, an Electronics Technician in RV Hero on her first Antarctic voyage, reaching nearby Palmer Station on Christmas Eve, 1968.

References 

Islands of the Palmer Archipelago